The 1935–36 Cypriot Cup was the second edition of the Cypriot Cup. A total of 8 clubs entered the competition. It began on 13 October 1935 with the quarterfinals and concluded on 3 November 1935 with the final which was held at GSP Stadium. Enosis Neon Trust won their 2nd Cypriot Cup trophy after beating Lefkoşa Türk Spor Kulübü 1–0 in the final.

Format 
In the 1935–36 Cypriot Cup, participated all the teams of the Cypriot First Division.

The competition consisted of three knock-out rounds. In all rounds each tie was played as a single leg and was held at the home ground of the one of the two teams, according to the draw results. Each tie winner was qualifying to the next round. If a match was drawn, extra time was following. If extra time was drawn, there was a replay match.

Quarter-finals

Semi-finals

Final

Sources

Bibliography

See also 
 Cypriot Cup
 1935–36 Cypriot First Division

Cypriot Cup seasons
1935–36 domestic association football cups
1935–36 in Cypriot football